John of Cornwall (also Johannes Cornubiensis, John of St. Germans, or Johannes de Sancto Germano) may refer to:
John of Cornwall (theologian) (12th century)
John of Cornwall (13th century) son of Richard of Cornwall
John of Cornwall (grammarian) (14th century)

See also
John Cornwall (disambiguation)